Ann Linnaea Simmons (born March 10, 1953) is an American former competition swimmer who represented the United States at the 1972 Summer Olympics in Munich, Germany.  She competed in the women's 800-meter freestyle and finished fourth in the event final with a time of 8:57.62—a fraction of a second behind third-place Novella Calligaris of Italy.

Simmons graduated from Millikan High School in Long Beach, California.  She attended Long Beach City College (LBCC) and the University of California, Los Angeles (UCLA).  She swam for the LBCC and UCLA Bruins swimming and diving teams, and later coached the University of California, Irvine women's swimming team.

See also
 List of University of California, Los Angeles people
 World record progression 800 metres freestyle

References

1953 births
Living people
American female freestyle swimmers
World record setters in swimming
Olympic swimmers of the United States
Swimmers from Santa Monica, California
Swimmers at the 1971 Pan American Games
Swimmers at the 1972 Summer Olympics
UCLA Bruins women's swimmers
Pan American Games gold medalists for the United States
Pan American Games medalists in swimming
Universiade medalists in swimming
Universiade gold medalists for the United States
Medalists at the 1973 Summer Universiade
Medalists at the 1971 Pan American Games